The 1983 Seattle Seahawks season was the team's eighth season with the National Football League (NFL).

The 1983 season was the first season head coach Chuck Knox coached the team. It was also the first season in which the Seahawks made the AFC playoffs, where they won the first two postseason games in franchise history, before losing in the AFC Championship Game to the eventual Super Bowl champion Los Angeles Raiders 30–14. The AFC Championship game against the Raiders would be the only time the Seahawks would appear in the AFC Championship game, as they failed to appear in one from 1984 to 2001, the rest of their time in the AFC. They would not reach a conference championship again until 2005, when they were in the NFC West.

Offseason
The Seattle Seahawks hired Chuck Knox, a coach capable of creating comebacks for teams. They also modified their uniforms, incorporating the Seahawks logo onto the jersey's sleeves. The TV numbers were moved from the jersey sleeves to the shoulders. The helmet facemasks became blue, and the socks became all blue. The uniform would remain basically unchanged through the 2001 season.

NFL Draft

Personnel

Staff

Final roster

 (*) Denotes players that were selected for the 1984 Pro Bowl.

Schedule

Preseason

Source: Seahawks Media Guides

Regular season
Divisional matchups have the AFC West playing the NFC East.

Bold indicates division opponents.
Source: 1983 NFL season results

Postseason
The Seahawks entered the playoffs for the first time in franchise history, after two close attempts in 1978 and 1979.

Standings

Game Summaries

Preseason

Week P1: at Denver Broncos

Week P2: vs. Green Bay Packers

Week P3: vs. Minnesota Vikings

Week P4: at San Francisco 49ers

Regular season

Week 1: at Kansas City Chiefs

Week 2: at New York Jets

Week 3: vs. San Diego Chargers

Week 4: vs. Washington Redskins

Week 5: at Cleveland Browns

Week 6: at San Diego Chargers

Week 7: vs. Los Angeles Raiders

Week 8: vs. Pittsburgh Steelers

Week 9: at Los Angeles Raiders

Week 10: vs. Denver Broncos

Week 11: at St. Louis Cardinals

Week 12: at Denver Broncos

Week 13: vs. Kansas City Chiefs

Week 14: vs. Dallas Cowboys

Week 15: at New York Giants

Week 16: vs. New England Patriots

Postseason

Seattle entered the postseason as the #4 seed in the AFC.

AFC Wild Card Playoff: vs. #5 Denver Broncos

AFC Divisional Playoff: at #2 Miami Dolphins

AFC Championship Game: at #1 Los Angeles Raiders

References

External links
 Seahawks draft history at NFL.com
 1983 NFL season results at NFL.com

Seattle
Seattle Seahawks seasons